Iron Block Building may refer to:

 Iron Block Building (Bradenton, Florida)
 Iron Block Building (Milwaukee, Wisconsin) on the National Register of Historic Places listings in Milwaukee, Wisconsin